This is a list of countries by area in 1989, providing an overview of the world population before the fall of the Iron Curtain.

Political developments before the summer of 1990 are taken into account, including Namibian independence but not German reunification which was finalised only in October, the breakup of Yugoslavia and dissolution of the Soviet Union took place two years later, and the dissolution of Czechoslovakia three years later.

Countries and dependencies by area

Notes

References 

 
Geography-related lists
Area
Lists by area
Area